Parmelee Massif is a rugged mountain massif standing west of the base of Imshaug Peninsula at the head of Lehrke Inlet, on the east coast of Palmer Land. Mapped by United States Geological Survey (USGS) in 1974. Named by Advisory Committee on Antarctic Names (US-ACAN) for David F. Parmelee, United States Antarctic Research Program (USARP) biologist who studied birds of the Antarctic pack ice ecosystems in the Antarctic Peninsula area from aboard icebreakers in 1972–73, 1973–74 and 1974–75.

See also
Neilson Peak

Mountains of Palmer Land